Twin Creek may refer to:

Twin Creek (Ohio), a tributary of the Great Miami River
Twin Creek Formation, in Idaho
Twin Creek Limestone, in Wyoming